The Governor of Irkutsk Oblast is highest official of Irkutsk Oblast. The office of governor of Irkutsk Governorate was established in 1783 as part of the Russian Empire. In 1926, under the Soviet Union, the governorate became part of the newly created Siberian Krai, which lasted until its division in 1930 into  and West Siberian Krais. The area of the former Irkutsk Governorate became part of the East Siberian Krai. In 1936 East Siberian Krai was further divided up, and in 1937 the remaining area was split into Chita Oblast and Irkutsk Oblast. Since then Irkutsk Oblast has been an independent federal subject of Russia.

Powers and responsibilities 

 Promote or rejects the laws passed by the Irkutsk Oblast Duma.
 Submits a reports on the execution of regional budget to the Oblast Duma.
 Submits the draft strategies for the socio-economic development of the oblast and an annual report on the implementation and effectiveness of the state programs of Irkutsk Oblast.
 Attends the meetings of Oblast Duma and submits annual reports on the activity of the Government of Irkutsk Oblast, including the issues raised by the members of Oblast Duma.
 Decides on early termination of the Irkutsk Oblast Duma.
 Determines the structure of state powers of the Irkutsk Oblast in accordance with the charter of Irkutsk Oblast.
 With the coordination with Oblast Duma; He appoints the First Deputy Governor of Irkutsk Province.
 Can dismiss the First Deputy Governor of Irkutsk Oblast.
 Forms the government of Irkutsk Oblast and appoints the Chairman of the Government, First Deputy Chairman of the Government, and the government ministers of Irkutsk Oblast and can also dismissed them.
 Determines the main activities of the Government of Irkutsk Oblast.
 Had a right to call an emergency session of the Irkutsk Oblast Duma.
 Decides the dismissal of the Government of Irkutsk Oblast.
 Appoints a representative of the Government of Irkutsk Oblast to the Federation Council.
 Appoints the position of the Commissioner for the Protection of the Rights of Entrepreneurs of the Irkutsk Oblast.
 Appoints the Prosecutor of Irkutsk Oblast.
 Submits the report to the President of Russia on the performance of the Executive bodies of Irkutsk Oblast.
 Has a right to conduct referendum in Irkutsk Oblast.
 Can dismissed the heads of local administration of Irkutsk Oblast.
 Give titles and awards of the Irkutsk Oblast.
 The Governor of Irkutsk Oblast exercises other powers in accordance with the Constitution of Russia and the Charter of Irkutsk Oblast.

Distribution of duties 

 Represents the Irkutsk Oblast in relations with federal state authorities, state authorities of other constituent entities of the Russian Federation, other state bodies of the Irkutsk Oblast, local governments and other municipal bodies of the municipal formations of the Irkutsk region, organizations, public associations and citizens, as well as international and foreign economic relations of the Irkutsk Oblast.
 Within the framework of determining the main areas of activity of the Government of the Irkutsk Oblast, issues instructions (instructions) to the First Deputy Governor of the Irkutsk Oblast - the Chairman of the Government of the Irkutsk Oblast, Deputy Governors of the Irkutsk Oblast, Deputy Chairmen of the Government of the Irkutsk Oblast, Ministers of the Irkutsk Oblast (hereinafter - members of the Government of the Irkutsk Oblast).

Term of office 
Since May 2003 the governor has been elected for a five-year term. Prior to this it was a four-year term.

Current cabinet 
All cabinet ministers are appointed by the Governor.

Current cabinet 
As of March 2020, the cabinet members are as follows:

List of governors since 1991

Heads of the region in previous eras

Irkutsk Governorate, Russian Empire (1783–1917)

Soviet Union

Siberian Krai (1925–1930)

East Siberian Krai (1930–1937)

Irkutsk Oblast (1937–1991)

References

External links 

 Government of Irkutsk Oblast
 Governors of Irkutsk Oblast since 2001
 Irkutsk Regional Party Committee
 Handbook of the History of the Communist Party of the Soviet Union 1898 - 1991: Irkutsk Oblast

 
Irkutsk Oblast
Politics of Irkutsk Oblast